The following is a list of Daredevil enemies.

A
 Angar the Screamer - An assassin whose screams create hallucinations.
 Ani-Men - A group of men equipped with animal-themed costumes by the Organizer. Most of the group would return to form the Unholy Three under the Exterminator (later called the Death-Stalker). The Death-Stalker would later make a second incarnation of the group.

B
 Baron Strucker - The founder of HYDRA and an enemy of both Captain America and the interests of America.
 Beetle - An armored criminal that often fought Spider-Man.
 Black Tarantula - A villain shrouded in mystery and misinformation who usually serves as an occasional adversary of Spider-Man.
 Blackwing - The son of Silvermane who employs trained bats.
 Blue Talon - A highly trained martial arts master from Japan with metal gauntlets on his wrists that make his hands stronger when fighting.
 Alexander Bont - The first Kingpin of Hell's Kitchen who returns from prison, claiming revenge against Daredevil for sending him to prison and to Matt Murdock for not helping him out as an attorney.
 Bruiser - A mercenary for hire, he has the ability to move his barycenter to certain parts of his body, allowing him to become a human bulldozer, able to hit from a certain point with all his weight in a burst of strength.
 Bullet - A mercenary who serves as an agent of the United States government.
 Bushwacker - A mutant-killer with a cybernetic gun-arm.
 Bullseye - A psychotic assassin and an archenemy of Daredevil.

C
 Chance - A gambling-themed hitman in a battlesuit.
 Copperhead - Murderous vigilante that died and returned as an agent for a demon.
 Crime-Wave - A criminal mastermind that sought to take over organized crime in New York.
 Crossbow - A British assassin that employs a crossbow.
 Crusher - A villain with super strength.

D
 Dark Messiah - A powerful madman that believed himself to be divine. He transformed three criminals (Josiah, Macabee, and Uriah) to become his Disciples of Doom and would later join Madame MacEvil's Terrible Trio.
 Death-Stalker - Philip Sterling assumed the role of the Death-Stalker (aka the Exterminator) to become a terrifying criminal after gaining strange powers from an accident with the time-displacer ray.

 Death's Head - Karen Page's father who went mad and became a costumed criminal.
 Doctor Octopus- One of Spider-Man's archenemies.

E
 Enforcers - A group of non-superpowered thugs who originally are enemies of Spider-Man. Although they technically have no superpowers, they are formidable fighters, so athletic and skilled that their fighting prowess is almost as good as if they had superpowers.
 Electro - A Spider-Man enemy who led the first Emissaries of Evil against Daredevil. Even though more of a Spider-Man foe, he was the first supervillain Daredevil would face.
 Eel - Edward Lavell fought Daredevil with the help of the Enforcers.
 Elektra - Once a lover of Daredevil, now an assassin.

G
 Gladiator - An armored thug who would eventually reform and become an ally of Daredevil.
 Green Goblin (Norman Osborn)
 Grotto - One of the Kingpin's employees and Turk's partner. A heavy-set, slow-witted bungler who gets beaten up a little less often than Turk, because he gives up more easily.

H
 Hand - A group of super powered ninjas.

I
 Indestructible Man - A munitions seller that became nigh-indestructible and a menace.
 Insomnia - A female villain who worked for Mr. Fear who had enhanced strength, durability and speed with superhuman sight and martial arts skills that battled Daredevil on the rooftops of the city.
 Ikari - Ikari (Japanese for fury) is a costumed martial artist who is hired by Lady Bullseye to help her kill Daredevil. Ikari wears a Japanese version of Daredevil's original costume and claims to have a radar sense just like him, except he can see. He also carries Kama weapons, like Daredevil carries his billy clubs. Daredevil lost to him the first time, but beat him in their rematch. He later appears in San Francisco now working for the Kingpin, where he helps kidnaps Murdock's friends and fought Daredevil again before being killed by the Shroud. Murdock would later impersonate Ikari to rescue his friends.

J
 Jaguar - An agent for HYDRA.
 Jester - A jester-like villain.

K
 Kingpin - A ruthless crime lord and the archenemy of Daredevil, indeed uncontested as Daredevil's greatest enemy. The Kingpin also serves as an enemy for the Punisher and Spider-Man.
 Kirigi - A ninja assassin after being resurrected by the Hand.

L
 Lady Bullseye - A female assassin who models herself after Bullseye.
 Leap-Frog - A frog-themed supervillain; now reformed.

M
 Machinesmith - A villain who specializes in robotics.
 Madame MacEvil - The leader of the Terrible Trio; she later reforms.
 Man-Bull - A man with the appearance of a humanoid bull.
 Felix Manning - A criminal who hired Gladiator to make a copy of the Daredevil costume for an unnamed violent mental patient.
 Masked Marauder - A costumed criminal scientist whose helmet projects "optiblasts" which can temporarily or permanently blind a victim.
 Matador - A criminal who once was a famous bullfighter.
 Mind-Master - Ruffio Costa is a Maggia crime lord who once kidnapped Robert Mallory's son Keith and held him for a ransom of the tidal station plans. This activity attracted the attention of Daredevil and the Black Panther. Due to him using a weapons lab as a hideout, he was bombarded by neutrons from an exploding machine and was transformed into Mind-Master, where he can fire incinerating blasts of psychic energy. Daredevil and the Black Panther were able to fight Mind-Master until his energy ran out and he regressed back to Ruffio. They defeated Ruffio and left him for the police.
 Mister Fear - A villain who uses a hallucinogenic gas to inspire fear into opponents much like the DC Comics villain the Scarecrow.
 Mister Hyde - A villain whose name and likeness are taken from the book character Dr. Jekyll and Mr. Hyde. Unlike the book character, this Mr. Hyde is also super-strong and nearly invulnerable.
 Muse - A serial killer that used his victims' remains to create artwork around New York City.
 Mysterio - Master of illusion, also often fought Spider-Man. Battled Daredevil during the "Guardian Devil" story arc.

N
 Nuke - One of the test subjects of the Weapon Plus program.

O
 The Owl - An owl-themed crime lord.
 Ox - Mostly one of the Enforcers but has established himself as a Daredevil villain on his own sometimes by occasionally working with Kingpin or Mister Fear.

P
 Paladin - An active and often violent mercenary who is sometimes in conflict with other superheroes.
 Plastoid - A robot assassin.
Prowler   Aaron Davis     is a career criminal and the uncle of Miles Morales, who became the second Spider-Man in this reality.
 Punisher - Frank Castle became the vigilante known as the Punisher to wage his own personal war against the criminal underworld. He comes into conflict with many heroes, most commonly Daredevil.
 Purple Man - A psychotic supervillain who can hypnotically control and manipulates people of his choice.

R
 Ramrod - A cyborg mercenary.

S
 Shock - Daughter of Mr. Fear IV (Alan Fagan), she has the power to induce fear, hatred and rage in others.
 Silvermane - Crime boss in the Maggia that took over HYDRA and tried to take over organized crime in New York. He is also the father of Blackwing.
 Stilt-Man - A thief that employs a suit of power armor and a pair of hydraulic stilts.
 Micah Synn - A Kinjorge chief that ran afoul of Daredevil and Kingpin.
 Spot - Low-level villain that can manipulate spatial portals. Originally a Spider-Man villain. Typically a gun-for-hire for larger rogues and crime organizations.
 Stunt-Master - A motorcycle themed villain who has clashed with Daredevil on more than one occasion.

T
 Tombstone - One of Kingpin's goons, capable of withstanding high caliber bullets and toxic gases because of his skin that is as strong as solid concrete.
 Tribune - A mad zealot that led a group to execute who he perceived as enemies of America's way of life.
 Typhoid Mary - Typhoid Mary is an enemy and former lover of Daredevil with low level psionic powers.
 Turk Barrett - One of Kingpin's employees, a bumbling idiot who gets beaten up a lot.
 Terrax - A monster who can paralyze by touch.

References

τList of Daredevil enemies
Daredevil enemies
Daredevil enemies